William Crickett Smith (February 8, 1881 - August 30, 1944) was an American ragtime, blues and jazz cornetist and trumpeter.

Career 
Little is known of Smith's early life, though he was born in Emporia, Kansas, the child of Tennessee Exodusters. 

His professional career began in childhood, performing in Nathaniel Clark Smith's Picaninny Band before moving into minstrel troupes, vaudeville and cabaret. In 1913-1914, he made several early recordings with James Reese Europe's group, the Clef Club Society Orchestra. Between 1914 and 1919, he performed in the Ford Dabney Orchestra, the resident band at Florenz Ziegfeld's Broadway cabaret, Midnight Frolics. Between 1917-1919, they produced several dozen phonographs.

In June 1919, Smith relocated to Paris, playing with Louis Mitchell's Jazz Kings from 1919-1924, a group that recorded for Pathe Records. He became the leader of Mitchell's group in 1923. He toured France, Spain and Russia with his own bands from 1925 to 1933. During the Depression, he spent nine years in Southeast Asia, working with Herb Flemming, Leon Abbey, and Teddy Weatherford, mostly in Bombay and Batavia. In 1936, he recorded with a group called the Symphonians. Around 1943 he returned to New York, and died late in 1944.

References
Rainer E. Lotz, "Crickett Smith". The New Grove Dictionary of Jazz. 2nd edition, ed. Barry Kernfeld, 2004.

American jazz trumpeters
American male trumpeters
American jazz cornetists
Musicians from Nashville, Tennessee
1880s births
1947 deaths
Jazz musicians from Tennessee
20th-century trumpeters
20th-century American male musicians
American male jazz musicians